Serbian school 'Nikola Tesla' Budapest is an educational institution located in Budapest, Hungary.

It was established as a school for all South Slavic nations in 1948. The school began its work in Pécs, but was soon out of political reasons, moved to Budapest. The school was subsequently replaced by the name South Slavic into Serbian and Croatian. In 1993, because of Yugoslav Wars, the school expelled part Croatian from its name. on 25 November 2012, the Serbian president Tomislav Nikolić visited the school.

Alumni
 Radovan Jelašić, Governor of National Bank of Serbia from 2004 to 2010

References

External links
 

Educational institutions established in 1948
Secondary schools in Hungary
Bilingual schools
Serbian schools outside Serbia
Schools in Hungary
Education in Budapest
1948 establishments in Hungary